The Spey River is a river in the Tasman Mountains in the northwest of the South Island of New Zealand.
The river drains Lake Aorere near the Aorere Saddle, and is fed by numerous small streams draining the Gouland Range on the west and part of the Domett Range (which the river bisects) on the east. It flows north then east before joining the upper reaches of the Aorere River.

References

Rivers of the Tasman District
Rivers of New Zealand